Breaking the Spell may refer to:

Breaking the Spell, a 1999 documentary film about the 1999 WTO riots by CrimethInc.
Breaking the Spell: Religion as a Natural Phenomenon, a 2006 book by Daniel Dennett
Breaking the Spell: My Life as a Rajneeshee and the Long Journey Back to Freedom, a 2009 book by Jane Stork

See also
Break the Spell, a 2011 album by Daughtry